Denise A. Galloway is the associate director of the Human Biology Division and scientific director of the Pathogen-Associated Malignancies Integrated Research Center at Fred Hutchinson Cancer Research Center, and a professor of microbiology and pathology at the University of Washington School of Medicine. Her research focuses on human papillomavirus and its role in the development of cancer.

Education 
Galloway attended Hunter College High School in New York. Galloway received her Ph.D. in molecular biology from the City University of New York in 1975, followed by a postdoctoral fellowship at Cold Spring Harbor Laboratory in 1978.

Career 
Currently, she is the associate director of the Human Biology Division at Fred Hutchinson Cancer Research Center and the Paul Stephanus Memorial Endowed Chair of microbiology and pathology at the University of Washington School of Medicine.

Her research was involved in the development of HPV vaccination as a cancer prevention measure. Her research continues to work on how these types of viruses cause and interact with other types of cancers.

She was elected to the American Academy of Arts and Sciences in 2019.  She became a Fellow of the American Association for Cancer Research in 2022.

Personal life 
Galloway has two daughters.

References

External links 
 Expert Point of View: Denise A. Galloway, PhD

Living people
Year of birth missing (living people)
American molecular biologists
Cancer researchers
Fellows of the American Academy of Arts and Sciences
University of Washington faculty
City University of New York alumni
Fellows of the American Academy of Microbiology
American women scientists
Fred Hutchinson Cancer Research Center people